Matsuyama is a Japanese surname. Notable people with the surname include:

, Japanese golfer
, Japanese sailor
, Japanese actor
, Japanese billiards player
, Japanese geophysicist
, senior officer in the Imperial Japanese Navy during World War II
, Japanese badminton player
, Japanese baseball player
, Japanese production designer and art director
, Japanese actor and voice actor

See also
Masuyama, a Japanese surname

Japanese-language surnames